Jakarta Fashion Week or JFW is a fashion event held annually in Jakarta, Indonesia. JFW is dubbed as the largest fashion event in Southeast Asia. JFW is organized as a collaboration platform between major stakeholders of the fashion and creative industry with the industry actors and community by GCM Group (formerly part of Femina Group).

The event aims to provide directions to the Indonesian fashion industry as well as a vehicle to demonstrate its wealth in talents and creativity, and ultimately transform Jakarta as a major fashion hub in the region and the world.

All the shows are invites-only, targeted to celebrities, socialites, buyers, local and foreign media and all who love fashion, that can ultimately enjoy the presentation from their favorite international and especially Indonesian designers, such as Anne Avantie, Rinaldy Yunardi, and Dian Pelangi.

Origins

As a media group, Femina Group had been back and forth to all major fashion weeks throughout the world. As the world's most populous Muslim majority country, Indonesia has a high demand for clothing that adheres to religious rules emphasizing modesty for women. One of the main goals of JFW is to transform the country's fashion industry to become one of the global leaders in fashion, especially the modest fashion industry that is worth nearly $100 billion.

In 2008, JFW was initiated for the first time by Femina Group, with the support from the DKI Jakarta Tourism Office, Indonesian Fashion Designers Association (APPMI), and the Indonesian Fashion Designers Association (IPMI).

Rebranding
When Femina Group reorganized the group into Femina Group and GCM Group in late 2018, JFW became part of GCM Group entirely, along with Dewi Magazine, pesona.co.id, Primarasa, and Cita Cinta.

JFW announced a new logo, eliminating the coin-shaped silhouette and the signature red "f" on January 30, 2019, initially on Instagram. The caption was simply: "We have been using the iconic coin-shaped logo since 2010. It's time to #StartFresh."

Locations
Since its first implementation in 2008 to 2011, JFW was held at Pacific Place Jakarta. In 2012, JFW was held at Plaza Senayan before finally being held at Senayan City throughout 2013–2019.

In 2020, JFW 2021 came with a new concept as an adaptation to the COVID-19 pandemic. The entire series of Jakarta Fashion Week 2021 events on 26–29 November 2020 was broadcast on www.jfw.tv and several digital platforms so that fashion enthusiasts from all over the world could watch the fashion shows, talk shows, and various JFW content.

Lomba Perancang Mode

Since its inception in 1978, Fashion Designer Competition or Lomba Perancang Mode (LPM) has orbited several of Indonesia's top designers, such as Itang Yunasz, Samuel Wattimena, Chossy Latu, Edward Hutabarat, Carmanita, Ferry Soenarto, Denny Wirawan, Musa Widiatmodjo, Stephanus Hamy, Widhi Budimulia, Tex Saverio, Jeffrey Tan, Natalia Kiantoro, Andreas Odang, Cynthia Tan, and Billy Tjong.

Had a hiatus due to the monetary crisis from 1997 to 2002, this annual event was reopened in 2003 and is now held every two years. With this change in implementation time, it is expected that the number of participants will become more numerous, and provide longer opportunities for prospective designers to think, so as to be able to provide their best work.

In 2008, Pia Alisjahbana, the same figure that initiated the Lomba Perancang Mode, coined the Lomba Perancang Aksesori that ever since then is also held biannually - alternating with the LPM competition. Rinaldy Yunardi, the godfather of Indonesian avant-garde accessory designers is a frequent judge-mentor in this competition. Some notable alumni of this competition are Amanda Mitsuri and Yonatan Digo Permadi.

The rapid growth of men's lifestyle business was the focus in 2010s, providing a gap for the shining of new creative talents to reach for the fresh but not so new market. Embracing the new niche, Menswear Fashion Design Competition (LPM Menswear) was introduced in 2017 and is held annually ever since.

Indonesia Fashion Forward
Indonesia Fashion Forward (IFF) is an intensive and curative program for capacity development with a vision to polish Indonesian designers’ skills so that they're able to enter the regional and international market by giving guidance alongside training that involves business strategy and branding.

Not just being an educational platform that equips designers with theory and simulations, IFF cooperates with strategic partners from the government to international so that the program can have continuity to practice on the ground. This program was initiated in 2012 by JFW and British Council, with support from BEKRAF in its early years, and now has guided more than 40 designers about the ins and outs of the fashion business so that they have the right capitals to become a global player.

Its main education partner is the Center for Fashion Enterprise London, and it has several platform exchange program with various fashion week through its organizers or local creative authorities, such as Tokyo Fashion Week, Seoul Fashion KODE, Virgin Australia Melbourne Fashion Festival, Style Bangkok, and India Fashion Week.

The program stopped its curation in 2017 due to the lack of financial support from the national stakeholders, while British Council has never ceased its support for the program.

To further accommodate the growth of IFF, Fashionlink was initiated in 2012. On its first two days, usually held on the third day of JFW, professional buyers/retailers who have reserved their attendance can do a private viewing of the exclusive collections of selected designers in a special area. For ordinary visitors who want to shop, Fashionlink Hub & Market, the current name of Fashionlink Showroom and Market before its renaming in 2020, will be accessible throughout the remaining days.

Fashionlink subsequently had its own permanent retail space: Fashionlink x #BLCKVNUE (since 2016) in Senayan City and Fashionhub (since 2018) in Gandaria City. It also has a special edition market, part of JFW's Ramadan festivity: Ramadhan Fashion Festival, that is held annually during the fasting month, known as Fashionlink Ramadhan Market.

JFW Model Search
Jakarta Fashion Week Model Search, or abbreviated as JFW Model Search, is held annually to look for the best talent in the modeling world as well as being the main audition event for all models that will walk on the Jakarta Fashion Week runway since the first JFW in 2008.

This audition was exclusively held in Jakarta, until its expansion in 2017 that brought JFW Model Search to several other major cities in Indonesia, namely Bali, Yogyakarta, Surabaya, Medan, and Bandung. Also in 2017, JFW began searching for a figure called Face of Indonesia, the model ambassador for JFW. Wita Juwita became the first model to get this title.

In 2018, Face of JFW changed its name to Icons of JFW and chose not only one female model, but also one male model. In that year, Agnes Natasya Tjie and Adam Rosyidi were elected as Icons of JFW.

With the high public interest in this model selection event, JFW presented The Search for JFW Icons in 2019, a web series that aired exclusively on the YouTube channel of Jakarta Fashion Week. The first pair of models chosen through this web series were Devona Cools and Axel Jan Thierry. In 2020, two models who were selected as JFW Icons were Rizal Rama and Maria Karina.

List of Jakarta Fashion Weeks

See also

Indonesia Fashion Week
List of fashion events

References

External links

 
 Kompas-tv The Jakarta Fashion Week 2008 Channel
 Pacific Place Jakarta Official Site

Fashion events in Indonesia
Annual events in Indonesia
Fashion weeks
Fashion industry
2008 establishments in Indonesia
Recurring events established in 2008